Leo the Lion is the mascot for the Hollywood film studio Metro-Goldwyn-Mayer and one of its predecessors, Goldwyn Pictures, featured in the studio's production logo, which was created by the Paramount Pictures art director Lionel S. Reiss.

Since 1917, and through the time the studio was formed by the merger of Samuel Goldwyn's studio with Marcus Loew's Metro Pictures and Louis B. Mayer's company in 1924, there have been eleven different lions used for the MGM logo. Although MGM has referred to all of the lions used in their trademark as "Leo the Lion", only the lion in use since 1957 (a total of  years), was actually named "Leo". In 2021, MGM introduced a new CGI logo which features a lion partially based on Leo.

History

Slats (1924–1928) 

The lion was chosen as the company's mascot in 1916 by publicist Howard Dietz, as a tribute to his alma mater Columbia University, whose mascot is a lion. Dietz was most directly inspired by the university's fight song, "Roar, Lion, Roar".

Slats, trained by Volney Phifer, was the first lion used in the branding of the newly formed studio. Born at the Dublin Zoo on March 20, 1919, and originally named Cairbre (Gaelic for 'charioteer'), Slats was used on all black-and-white MGM films between 1924 and 1928. The first MGM film that used the logo was He Who Gets Slapped (1924).

Unlike his successors, Slats did nothing but look around in the logo, making him the only MGM lion not to roar. However, it is rumored that Phifer trained the lion to growl on cue, despite the fact that synchronized sound would not be used in motion pictures until 1927.

Slats died in 1936 when he was 17. At that time Phifer retired to his farm in Gillette, New Jersey, where he kept other animals used on Broadway. Upon his death, Phifer buried the lion on his farm and placed a plain block of granite to mark the grave. Later, Phifer planted a pine tree directly above the grave so that the roots would "hold down the lions spirit", replacing the granite block.

Jackie (1928–1956) 

Jackie was the second lion used for the MGM logo and the first MGM lion to audibly roar. Born around 1915, he was a wild lion cub brought from the Nubian Desert in Sudan, and trained by Mel Koontz.  Jackie roared three times before looking off to the right of the screen (the lion's left); in the early years that this logo was used (1928 – c. 1933), there was a slightly extended version wherein, after looking off to the right, the lion would return his gaze to the front a few seconds later. The roar was recorded long after Jackie was filmed and at least four different recordings of roars/growls were used, first heard via a gramophone record for MGM's first production with sound, White Shadows in the South Seas (1928). Jackie appeared on all black-and-white MGM films from 1928 to 1956 (replacing Slats), as well as the sepia-tinted opening credits of The Wizard of Oz (1939). He also appeared before MGM's black-and-white cartoons, such as the Flip the Frog and Willie Whopper series produced for MGM by the short-lived Ub Iwerks Studio, as well as the Captain and the Kids cartoons produced by MGM in 1938 and 1939. A colorized variation of the logo can be found on the colorized version of Babes in Toyland (1934), also known as March of the Wooden Soldiers; an animated version created using rotoscope appeared on the 1939 Captain and the Kids cartoon Petunia Natural Park. For the films Westward the Women and The Next Voice You Hear... (both 1950), a still frame of the logo – sans growling—was used at the beginning. Jackie would make his last film appearance at the beginning of the film Hearts of the West (1975).

In addition to appearing in the MGM logo, Jackie appeared in over a hundred films, including the Tarzan film series that starred Johnny Weissmuller. Jackie also appeared with an apprehensive Greta Garbo in a well-known 1926 publicity still. A short 1933 film of a very annoyed Jackie receiving a bath from trainer Mel Koontz also exists. The lion is also known for surviving several accidents, including two train wrecks, a sinking ship, an earthquake, and an explosion in the studio. The most notable accident was a plane crash. On September 16, 1927, Martin "Marty" Jenson was hired to take Jackie cross-country. The airplane was a B-1 Brougham airplane, a modified version of Charles Lindbergh's Spirit of St. Louis. Installed behind the pilot's seat was a glass enclosed iron bar cage. The plane took off from Camp Kearny Airfield, near San Diego. However, the plane was over weight as Jackie weighed 350 pounds. The excessive weight caused the plane to go down to the mountains of northern Arizona. Both Jenson and Jackie survived the crash and subsisted on milk, water and sandwiches that were on board the plane. After being rescued, a thin and weak Jackie was returned to MGM's handlers and was well cared for the rest of his life. Due to surviving these accidents, Jackie received the nickname "Leo the Lucky".

In the early 1930s, MGM reissued some of its earlier, pre-1928 silent films with prerecorded music soundtracks and sounds; such films included Greed (1924), Ben-Hur (1925), Flesh and the Devil (1926), and The Unknown (1927). For these sound reissues, the original Slats logo was replaced with Jackie.

In 1931, Jackie went on a farewell tour and subsequently retired to the Philadelphia Zoo. On February 25, 1935, Jackie was found dead by his zookeeper John McCullen. The cause of his death was attributed to heart issues. Jackie's body was flown from Philadelphia to Los Angeles where taxidermist Thomas Hodges preserved his skin into a rug. Francis Vaniman bought the rug and put it on display along with other animal skins on the third floor of his house in McPherson, Kansas, which later became the "African Room" in the McPherson Museum.

Bill The Lion (c. 1927–1928), Telly (1928–1932), Coffee (1932–1958) 

MGM began experiments with two-strip color short subjects in 1927 and animated cartoons in 1930. For these productions, three different lions were used.

Footage of the first lion is widely inaccessible, although a few frames of the logo with this lion exist in the public domain. He is known to have appeared in the silent color films Buffalo Bill's Last Fight (1927) and The Heart of General Robert E. Lee (1928). The former gave him the nickname Bill, while the latter is currently being restored by the Library of Congress.

The second lion, Telly, appeared on color MGM movies between 1928 and 1932. An extended version of the logo featuring Telly appears at the beginning of the film The Viking (1928), featuring the lion having the same roar as Jackie. In current prints of The Mysterious Island (1929), Telly appears in black and white because the color version is lost.

The third lion, Coffee, who was trained by Mel Koontz, appeared on color films between 1932 and 1934 or 1935 for the Happy Harmonies shorts, until production was switched to full three-strip Technicolor filming. The Cat and the Fiddle (1934) had brief color sequences, but was otherwise in black-and-white including its opening credits, so it used Jackie instead of Coffee. The Cat and the Fiddle however, showed its "The End" title card against a Technicolor background. An extended version of the logo featuring Coffee appears at the beginning of the short Wild People (1932), featuring the lion roaring three times, rather than just twice.

Tanner (1934–1956, 1963–1967) 
In 1934, MGM began producing its first full three-strip Technicolor film, Holland in Tulip Time (1934). Tanner, also trained by Mel Koontz, appeared on all Technicolor MGM films (1934–1956) and cartoons (1935–1958, 1963–1967, except for 1965's The Dot and the Line), replacing Telly and Coffee. The Wizard of Oz (1939) had the Oz scenes in color, but it had the opening credits, closing credits, and the Kansas scenes in sepia-toned black-and-white, so it used Jackie instead of Tanner. Third Dimensional Murder (1941) was shot in 3-D and in Technicolor, but it had the opening credits in black-and-white, so it also used Jackie instead of Tanner. The Picture of Dorian Gray (1945) and The Secret Garden (1949) both had brief color sequences, but were otherwise in black-and-white including their opening credits, so they used Jackie instead of Tanner as well. The Secret Garden, however, showed its "The End" title card and the cast list against a Technicolor background. The Long, Long Trailer (1954) and Forever, Darling (1956) use Tanner with Jackie's roar instead. Tanner roared three times in the logo; an extended version of this logo appeared on the Colortone Musicals shorts The Spectacle Maker and My Grandfather Clock (both 1934), Star Night at the Cocoanut Grove (1934), and several early James A. Fitzpatrick Traveltalks color shorts, with two additional roars from the lion.

Tanner was MGM's third longest-lived lion to be used, for a total of 22 years. His first feature film appearance was before Sweethearts four years later, in 1938. He featured after Jackie, who was used for a total of 28 years, and the current lion, who has been retained for  years. It is this version of the logo that was the most frequently used version throughout the Golden Age of Hollywood, although color did not really become the norm until the 1960s, and even then, many movies were still being made in black-and-white.

In addition to being used as MGM's lion mascot, Tanner also made an appearance before the film Countdown for Zorro (1936), Three Stooges shorts Movie Maniacs (1936), Wee Wee Monsieur (1938), Three Missing Links (1938), You Nazty Spy (1940) and Hold That Lion! (1947). Also, between the mid-1940s and 1960s, MGM's cartoon studio would use Tanner's roar as a sound effect for many of their animated shorts.

Tanner and Jackie were both kept in the change from Academy ratio films to widescreen CinemaScope movies in 1953, with Tanner for color movies and Jackie for black-and-white films. The logo was modified for this change; the marquee below the ribbon design was removed, and the company name was thus placed in a semi-circle above the ribbon.

George (1956–1957) 

The seventh lion, called George, was introduced in 1956, and appeared more heavily maned than any of the other lions. There were at least three different variations of the logo with George. His most famous film appearance was The Wings of Eagles (1957). The logo was reused from the Canadian VHS release of Cinema Paradiso (1988) (which was distributed by Alliance Releasing Home Video), while the logo was removed from the U.S. VHS release of Cinema Paradiso (1988) (which was distributed by HBO Video under license from Miramax Films).

Leo (1957–present) 
Leo, the eighth and current lion, is by far MGM's longest-used, having appeared on most MGM films since 1957. Leo was born in 1956 in Dublin Zoo, Ireland, the same as Slats. He was also the youngest at the time MGM filmed him roaring, hence his much smaller mane. Leo made his debut for the film Tip on a Dead Jockey.

Leo was purchased from animal dealer Henry Trefflich, and trained by Ralph Helfer. In addition to being used as the MGM lion, Leo also appeared in other productions such as the religious epic King of Kings (1961), The Lion (1962), Zebra in the Kitchen (1965), Fluffy (1965), and Napoleon and Samantha (1972); as well as a memorable TV commercial for Dreyfus Investments in 1961. Leo also made several appearances on the 1971–72 TV series The Pet Set, proving himself gentle enough to let a blind teenage girl pet him in one episode.

Two different versions of this logo were used: an "extended" version, with the lion roaring three times, used from 1957 to 1960, and the "standard" version, with the lion roaring twice, used since 1960. In the Chuck Jones-directed Tom and Jerry cartoons released by MGM Animation/Visual Arts between 1963 and 1967 (as with cartoons from the same series made between 1957 and 1958), Tanner was used in the opening sequence instead of Leo, albeit using Leo's roar. Three MGM films, Raintree County (1957), Ben-Hur (1959) and Mutiny on the Bounty (1962) utilized a still-frame variation of this logo on Raintree County and Mutiny of the Bounty also had the lion's roar played along with their opening scores. For Ben-Hur, the reason for this was because the film's director, William Wyler, thought that the roar would feel out of place for the opening nativity scene. This logo also appeared on black-and-white films, such as Jailhouse Rock (1957) and A Patch of Blue (1965). Some television prints of the 1943 film Cabin in the Sky, have replaced the Jackie logo with Leo for unknown reasons.

The logo was modified for MGM's 50th anniversary in 1974. The usual film ribbon appeared on screen with the phrase "BEGINNING OUR NEXT 50 YEARS..." on a black background within the film circle; the phrase dissolves as "Metro-Goldwyn-Mayer" (above the ribbon) and "GOLDEN ANNIVERSARY" (in place of the usual "TRADE MARK") both rendered in gold fade in along with Leo, who roars twice. This logo appeared on several MGM films released during 1974–75.

The logo was retained in the corporate revamp following MGM's acquisition of United Artists in 1981. The logo now read "MGM/UA Entertainment Co."; this logo would appear on all MGM/UA films from 1983 until 1986 and again in 1987 on the film O.C. and Stiggs, which was originally produced in 1985. It was also at this time that the original lion roar sound which actually sampled Tanner's roar was replaced with a remade stereophonic one, redone by Mark Mangini. This later version featured tiger sounds; as Mangini would later explain, "Lions don't make that kind of ferocious noises, and the logo needed to be ferocious and majestic.". The first film to use the new roar sound was Poltergeist (1982). Incidentally, the sound effect was also used for the "door ghost" near the end of the film.

From 1984 to 1985, MGM used a variation of its main studio logo for its 60th anniversary based on the print logo, with the ribbons in a golden color. Above the ribbons were the words "Diamond Jubilee", replacing the standard company name, and its font color was silver and below the ribboning was the phrase "Sixty Years of Great Entertainment". The "Ars Gratia Artis" motto was removed from inside the circle and replaced with the text "Metro-Goldwyn-Mayer/United Artists". The drama mask from the bottom had its surrounding laurels removed, and the mask itself was moved up a little so that an additional golden ribbon with the text reading "Entertainment Co." below would be added. Although the new roar effect done by Mangini was primarily being used at the time, 2010: The Year We Make Contact had both the original and 1982 roar effects mixed together.

When the company began using MGM and UA as separate brands in 1986, a new logo for MGM was introduced; the same gold ribbons used for the "Diamond Jubilee" variant was retained, and the text was redone in exactly the same color. The following year, a new "MGM/UA Communications Co." logo was introduced, and would precede both the MGM and UA logos until it was dropped in 1990. However, both logos would maintain the byline "An MGM/UA Communications Company" until 1992. Mangini remixed Leo's 1982 roar in 1995, using digital audio technology to blend it in with several other roar sounds; the remixed sound effect debuted with the release of Cutthroat Island (1995). This was done to give the roar more "muscle" which an MGM executive reportedly had found the iconic sound to be lacking beforehand, as well as fit it into films with 5.1 surround sound. In 2001, MGM's website address, "www.mgm.com", was added to the bottom of the logo.

The logo was revised again in 2008, with the ribbons, text, and drama mask done in a more brilliant gold color. Also, Leo's image was digitally restored and enhanced, thanks to the work of staff at Pacific Title: first off, a three-dimensional model of Leo's mane was designed, and then composited and blended onto the lion's actual mane; secondly, the tips of the lion's ears were digitally remodeled, so that the tip of his left ear would now cross in front of the film ribbon, in an effort to give the logo more depth. For the restoration process, the extended "three-roar" version of Leo's footage was used, sourced from the master negative print of 1958's Cat on a Hot Tin Roof, as the original, raw footage of the lion, which was originally going to be used for the restoration, had been considered lost by this point. For MGM's upcoming feature films, it would have to be shortened to show the lion roaring just twice. The new logo's design was based on that of MGM's then-current print logo, which had been introduced in 1992. The website address was also shortened to "MGM.COM". The lion's roar was remixed once again by sound editor Eric Martel, maintaining most of the original 1982 sound elements. However, beginning with The Taking of Pelham 123 (2009), the 1995 roar was reused. The newly-done logo debuted with the release of the James Bond film Quantum of Solace.

In 2012, Shine Studio was chosen to redesign and animate the logo in stereoscopic 3-D (three-dimensional). A lion's eye irises in and zooms out to reveal Leo the Lion encircled in a digital moving golden filmstrip.  Shine re-built all the elements of the logo in 3-D and then placed on different planes to add dimensional layers and drama, including the words "Ars Gratia Artis" moving from right to left. The 1995 roar and the digitally restored and enhanced 1957 footage is reused once again as Leo roars and the company name is brought in from above to center the top screen, which completes the logo sequence. MGM's website address was removed, as MGM is no longer as of 2012 a self-distribution entity, but rather a production company. This logo was first used in the 2012 James Bond film Skyfall.

On March 8, 2021, MGM unveiled an updated logo, with Leo now being CGI animated, while being based on its 1957 footage, the first major redesign for the mascot in over six decades. The latest rendition leans into the company's traditional gold design, filtering out sepia tones and modernizing the logo by sharpening the film roll, mask and lettering. The biggest change is evident in the brand's new monogram, which uses the classic font of the MGM logo rather than the blocky lettering associated with MGM Resorts. Furthermore, the motto now shows its English translation, "Art for Art's Sake", then changing to its original Latin motto. It also had a proper fanfare composed by Sounds Red, alongside the re-used 1995 roar. MGM worked with Culver City, Calif.-based Baked Studios on the new look. While the new logo, similar to the previous logos, was set to be unveiled with the James Bond film No Time to Die, it was frequently delayed over 2 years from its intended November 2019 release to October 2021 due to the ongoing COVID-19 pandemic. It instead debuted with the Aretha Franklin biopic Respect, which was released on August 13, 2021. On January 19, 2022, a special variation was released to coincide with the 60th anniversary of the James Bond franchise, with the logo zooming out further to make room for the "60 Years of Bond" logo which appears on the right next to it. It premiered in front of the IMAX re-release engagement of No Time to Die on January 21, 2022, and appeared on Ron Howard's Thirteen Lives and the documentary The Sound of 007. Beginning with 2021's Wrath of Man (released just over 2 months after the unveiling of the new MGM logo, though the film itself retains the 2012-era logo), the company quietly unveiled a new secondary logo mainly used for digital/physical/television advertising (as well as becoming the new logo on the company's home entertainment releases and film posters), phasing out the static MGM logo (though it remains at the end of the company's films) in favor of simply the company's initials, written in the company's longtime typeface.

Stylized Lion (1968) 

In 1965, in an attempt to update its image, MGM recruited Lippincott to create a more contemporary logo. The result, a circular still graphic of a lion known as "The Stylized Lion", appeared at the beginning of two films in 1968: 2001: A Space Odyssey and The Subject Was Roses. Afterwards, Leo was reinstated for the opening logo.

The Stylized Lion, however, was retained by the studio as its print logo, used on theatrical posters and by the MGM Records division studio advertising, in addition to being shown at the end of credit rolls following most MGM movie releases of this period, continuing until 1982. It was later used by the MGM Grand casinos. A refined version of it is used as the logo for their parent company, MGM Resorts International.

Secondary MGM logo 
MGM also used a secondary logo, seen in the opening and closing credits of most classic MGM movies. This design originated as the Metro-Goldwyn Pictures logo from 1923 to 1925. The logo features a graphic of a reclining lion (from a side view) on a pedestal that has the text "A Metro-Goldwyn-Mayer Picture" inscribed on it. Behind the lion is a semi-circular film ribbon with the "Ars Gratia Artis" motto ("Art for art's sake"), much like the film ribboning of the company's primary logo. On either side of the pedestal are torches. This secondary logo was used in the opening title and end titles of most MGM films from the mid-1920s until the early 1960s, then moved to the main film credits until c. 1983. This logo was last seen in the 1994 film That's Entertainment! III.

Many of the short subjects produced by Hal Roach studios during the late 1920s and 1930s such as Our Gang and Laurel and Hardy featured a variation of the secondary logo in their closing titles. This variation had a lion cub on the pedestal, looking straight at the viewer.

In addition, several MGM films made in the late 1930s and early '40s set their entire opening credits against a background of a relief carving of an outline of the reclining lion image, similar to the one seen on the secondary logo. Among the many films that include this kind of credits sequence are Ninotchka (1939), starring Greta Garbo and This Man's Navy (1945) with Wallace Beery. This reclining lion image was later used as the logo for MGM Television in the late 1950s.

Puppet 
Little Leo the Lion, “son of” the “real” Leo, appears as an elaborate hand puppet on MGM Parade, a 1955–1956 television show. In the second episode, he reclines on a bookcase in the “MGM Trophy Room” set, wearing full evening dress (but no shoes). Leo interrupts host George Murphy to speak for all the cartoon animals who want to appear on MGM Parade. He introduces the animals' pitch reel, a 7-minute Tex Avery cartoon. Leo promises more acts for next week, but Murphy replies with a variation on the cliché, “Don't call me, I'll call you.”

Parodies 
The Leo the Lion logo had been parodied in many films and television programs.
Monty Python's film And Now for Something Completely Different (1971) parodied MGM's logo with a croaking frog in place of the lion. The Goodies episodes "Gender Education" and "The Movies" parodied the logo with a blanket obscured man and a chicken respectively taking the lion's place.

The logo for MTM Enterprises used on its television shows, including The Mary Tyler Moore Show, The Bob Newhart Show and others, parodied the Leo the Lion logo with its colophon, at the very end of the program. In place of Leo was Mimsie the Cat, who meowed at the end of each show. The ribbon over the kitten's head read "MTM" instead of "Ars Gratia Artis." On the later Newhart show, Mimsie's voice was replaced by Bob Newhart meowing in his trademark deadpan style at the end of each episode, except for the 1982 pilot (which used the standard version), and the 1990 finale, (which was replaced by the Darryls yelling "QUIET!!", which was their only line of dialogue during the shows run). For other MTM shows, Mimsie would wear an appropriate costume: a policeman's cap for Hill Street Blues, a "Sherlock Holmes" deerstalker cap and pipe for Remington Steeleand a surgical mask and scrubs for St. Elsewhere. Mimsie "flatlined" following the final episode of St. Elsewhere in 1988.

MGM made the first of several spoofs of their own logo for the first Marx Brothers MGM film, A Night at the Opera (1935). Jackie appears in the opening credits for the actual film, but the trailer for the film shows an unknown lion that looks similar to Tanner, followed by Groucho, then Chico, roaring inside of the film circle, with the sound of the real lion being heard, and then Harpo doing the same, but silently. (Harpo then honks his horn instead of roaring again.) This parody was originally intended to open the actual film, but MGM mogul Louis B. Mayer felt the spoof would "cheapen" the studio's respected trademark.

Another parody MGM used for its own logo appeared in Roman Polanski's 1967 film, The Fearless Vampire Killers. Here, the lion morphs into a creepy-looking cartoon vampire with blood dripping from its mouth; in the European version, after a short introductory cartoon, Leo zooms in and roars as the cartoon's two main characters cower in fear, then grows saber-teeth (like the extinct cat Smilodon) as they run off.

The 1983 Canadian beer-themed comedy film Strange Brew opens with a one-off version of the MGM logo where the lion belches within one second of the fade-in. Then the lion grunts and the camera begins a sweeping dolly move to the right and then the rear of the logo.  Behind the logo, Rick Moranis and Dave Thomas as Bob and Doug McKenzie are trying to goad the sedated lion into roaring.  Thomas (as Doug) says, "Maybe I oughta crank his tail, eh?  That oughta start him up."  He then begins cranking the lion's tail, yelling "start up, eh!"  When the lion stirs, Moranis (as Bob) says "Oh, jeez, he's getting mad, eh?"  Then, in a breaking of the fourth wall, they both notice the camera and run to their Great White North set to begin the movie. The lion also growled during that scene. The 1981 roar was reused.

In The Pink Panther (2006), starring Steve Martin, Leo starts roaring, but is then interrupted as Inspector Clouseau opens the circle like a door, looking around the place before leaving. The Pink Panther character appears behind him unnoticed, cleverly smirking, and closes the door immediately afterwards, leaving Leo confused.

In The Crocodile Hunter: Collision Course (2002), Leo is replaced with a saltwater crocodile. A trailer for the film features a lion different from the standard lion; Steve Irwin also appears and breaks the fourth wall by briefly addressing the viewers.

In an episode of Sidekick called "Trevor the Hero", the title card has Eric as the drama mask and Trevor in the logo acting like the MGM Lion.

The Steven Universe episode "Lion 2: the Movie" ends with Steven's pet lion, Lion, appearing in a spoof of the MGM logo. MGM parodied their logo in several of their cartoons.

In the Tom and Jerry cartoon Switchin' Kitten (1961), Jerry roars like Leo as his mouse hole that resembles the ribbon of the MGM logo (in gold). In addition, the Chuck Jones-directed Tom and Jerry cartoons from 1963 to 1967 begin with a cartoon variation of the MGM logo using Tanner instead of Leo. Tanner from the early Tom and Jerry cartoon intros from MGM roars at the beginning, and is then replaced by Tom, who yowls and hisses; the logo then transitions to the cartoon series' title sequence. Also, in the episode "Sorry Safari", there is a lion in the jungle sitting down and roaring while the company's name is on the top of the screen. The same lion appears later in the episode.

In the 1933 Looney Tunes cartoon Bosko's Picture Show, the feature film shown in Bosko's theater is produced by the "TNT Pictures" company, whose logo is a roaring and burping lion with the motto Eenie Meanie Minie Moe. Other Warner Bros. cartoons, such as She Was an Acrobat's Daughter and Bacall to Arms also poke fun at their cross-town rival studio. (Ironically, MGM would obtain the rights to these two cartoons in 1981 through United Artists and UA's purchase of Associated Artists Productions and its library in 1958, which included all pre-August 1948 color Looney Tunes/Merrie Melodies.)

In National Lampoon's Animal House (1978), the motto of the Delta House is "Ars Gratia Artis".

The Soviet animated film Ograblenie po... (1978/1988) parodied the logo with Cheburashka replacing the lion.

The animated television series Tiny Toon Adventures included "end tags" for several of its main characters – short clips featuring the character(s) that were played immediately after the end credits. One of the end tags and post-credit scenes featured the character Furrball, who began by roaring at the screen like a lion before covering his mouth and letting out an apologetic mew.

The Muppets parodied the logo in two of their productions in 1981. It was spoofed by Animal in the role of Leo in The Great Muppet Caper, and by Fozzie Bear in the same role in The Muppets Go to the Movies. Also, in one Muppet Babies episode ("The Daily Muppet," which first aired on CBS-TV Saturday, November 1, 1986), Baby Animal roars as Gonzo's face replaces the mask usually seen under the lion.

One of the episode title cards for the animated PBS series, Arthur (the episode "Sue Ellen Moves In") involves Buster walking into the circle and roaring like the MGM lion (subsequent episodes with the title card would feature Buster making other noises such as an elephant trumpeting or simply belching). The titular character then walks up behind him and laughs.

The animated sitcom Family Guy parodied Leo in the Season 12 episode "Brian's a Bad Father".

The Pokémon anime featured a Zorua, a Meowth, and a Pikachu parodying Leo.

In the 1997 Warner Bros./Turner Pictures/Turner Feature Animation feature film Cats Don't Dance, the story takes place at Mammoth Pictures in Hollywood. Mammoth's logo is also a spoof of MGM's, with a trumpeting elephant seen in the filmstrip circle and a Latin motto in the filmstrip above the elephant's head reading, "Optimum Est Maximum," which translates to "Bigger is better."

A "film" called Sonia Honey (a spoof of skater/actress Sonia Henie) was featured in the "movie" segment of an episode of The Carol Burnett Show which originally aired on CBS-TV on Wednesday, October 13, 1971, at 8:00 P.M. Eastern time. The "film" was produced by "Metro-Goldwyn-Mouth," with Ms. Burnett seen in the filmstrip circle in a sequined dress and heard doing a variation on her famous "Tarzan yell," with the "studio"'s name seen in a Wide Latin chiseled font on the top of the circle (a la the MGM logo of the 1950s).

In an episode of Punky Brewster entitled "Punky Brewster's Workout," Punky, Margeaux, and Alan make a Jane Fonda-style workout video. The "video" is produced by "P.B.P." (Punky Brewster Productions), with an MGM logo parody at the end of the video, in which Punky's dog, Brandon, is seen and heard barking in the filmstrip circle, drawn and colored in by the kids.

In an episode of the PBS kids' series Zoom, which aired Monday, January 9, 1978, "Zoomer" Shona parodies Leo for the opening of the "Cinema ZOOM" segment.

Other parodies, in Malaysian cartoon Upin & Ipin character, Kak Ros parody MGM logo old version with the gold logo sign in a special episode of Upin & Ipin.

See also 
 Metro-Goldwyn-Mayer
 MGM Television
 Metro-Goldwyn-Mayer cartoon studio
 The Lionhearts
 Art for art's sake
 List of Metro-Goldwyn-Mayer films

References

External links 
 MGM official site
 MGM page at Hollywood Lost and Found
 Lion roar (MP3 format), as trademarked by MGM, at the United States Patent and Trademark Office website
 Video compilation MGM Logo History (1916–2021)

Metro-Goldwyn-Mayer
Corporate mascots
Film and television opening sequences
Lion mascots
Film studio mascots
Sound trademarks
Individual lions
Fictional lions
Male characters in film
Male characters in advertising
Mascots introduced in 1916
Animal actors